Tyler Morgan (born 11 September 1995) is a Welsh rugby union player for Biarritz Olympique in the Pro D2. Morgan's primary position is Outside Centre.

On 26 December 2014, Morgan signed a National Dual Contract with the WRU and the Dragons.

On 16 May 2022, Morgan was released by Scarlets.

International

On 20 January 2015, Morgan was named in the 34-man senior Wales squad for the 2015 Six Nations Championship

Morgan made his full international debut in the starting line up for Wales versus Ireland on 8 August 2015.

On 2 October 2015, Morgan got his second cap for wales in the Pool A victory against Fiji, starting in the no13 jersey.

International tries

References

External links 
Dragons profile

People educated at Caerleon Comprehensive School
Rugby union players from Newport, Wales
Welsh rugby union players
Wales international rugby union players
Dragons RFC players
Living people
1995 births
Newport RFC players
Rugby union players from Caerleon
Scarlets players
Rugby union centres